East Heslerton is a village, near Malton in North Yorkshire, England. It lies between the villages of West Heslerton and Sherburn, at the interface between the Vale of Pickering to the north and the Yorkshire Wolds to the south. With West Heslerton it forms part of the civil parish of Heslerton which had a population of 409 at the 2011 census. The village was named on early maps as Heslerton Parva.

East Heslerton forms the westernmost part of the Sherburn ward of Ryedale District Council. The ward extends eastwards as far as Staxton.

The Yorkshire Wolds Way and Centenary Way pass approximately one mile to the south of the village.

History
A Neolithic barrow group lies on East Heslerton Brow at the top of the Wold escarpment.

There is a deserted village at Manor Farm near East Heslerton which is open to the public all year. Visitors can see the remains set in ridge and furrow fields.

From 1918 to 1939 East Heslerton Aerodrome was used by the Royal Air Force and civilian pilots. It was located to the east of the village and commemorated by a plaque on the East Heslerton Church Rooms.

Until 1974 the village lay in the historic county boundaries of the East Riding of Yorkshire.

The church of Saint Andrew

The church  was designed by George Edmund Street commissioned by Sir Tatton Sykes of  Sledmere House. Work started in 1873 and St Andrew's was completed in 1877. It has sculptures of the four saintly fathers of the Latin Church, St Augustine, St Ambrose, St Gregory and St Jerome, all modelled by James Redfern. They were originally intended for the northern porch of Bristol Cathedral but were thought 
too "papist" by the Dean and rejected. They were rescued by Street.

The church is now redundant and the Grade I listed building is cared for by the Churches Conservation Trust.

Transport
The A64 trunk road passes through the village. A regular Yorkshire Coastliner bus service providing connections to Scarborough, Malton, York and Leeds is operated by Transdev Blazefield.

East Heslerton was served by Heslerton railway station on the York to Scarborough Line between 1845 and 1930.

References

External links
West and East Heslerton at Genuki accessed 20 February 2008

Villages in North Yorkshire